Bishop Stang High School is a private Catholic high school located in North Dartmouth, Massachusetts, in the New England region of the United States. It was the first diocesan secondary school in the Roman Catholic Diocese of Fall River, which includes the Southcoast Massachusetts, including Cape Cod and the islands of Martha's Vineyard and Nantucket. The school is named after William Stang, the first bishop of the Diocese of Fall River, and has been coeducational since its founding.

Location
It is located in the suburban town of Dartmouth, on the Southcoast of Massachusetts. Stang's  campus is 25 minutes west of Cape Cod and 20 minutes east of the Rhode Island border. Its 600-plus student body draws from more than 50 cities and towns in Massachusetts and Rhode Island.

Catholic secondary education in southeastern Massachusetts began in the early 20th century with local parochial schools affiliated with various Catholic parishes. Some of these, such as the now-closed Holy Family High School, located near St. Lawrence Church in New Bedford, had strong academic reputations and produced generations of prominent Catholic alumni in the region. While Stang was not the first Catholic secondary school in southeastern Massachusetts, it was the first regional, diocesan, coeducational institution. Founded in 1959, Stang's original faculty included Sisters of Notre Dame de Namur in full religious habit. The new  campus across from the Country Club of New Bedford in then-pastoral Dartmouth drew students from cities and towns in a  radius from Rhode Island to Cape Cod. In the years following the Second Vatican Council, the number of Sisters of Notre Dame decreased. By the 1970s the vast majority of faculty and administrators were lay men and women, and the remaining sisters dressed conservatively, but in lay clothing. Since its inception, Stang has had a large number of alumni return as teachers and administrators.

Academics
Bishop Stang is a nationally recognized Blue Ribbon School [1994-1996]. The United States Department of Education’s Blue Ribbon Program recognizes schools based on their academic excellence. Advanced placement courses at Bishop Stang are offered in Biology, Chemistry, Physics 1 and 2, Calculus A/B, Calculus B/C, Statistics, Computer Science, English Language & Composition, English Literature, Psychology, United States History, Studio Art, and European History. These mainly apply to Juniors and Seniors. Freshmen and Sophomores are eligible for Advanced Math placement—i.e. "skipping" a level of math according to their performance—in the course typically taken by the grade above them.  The College Gateway Program is the "dual-enrollment" program that allows students to earn college credit that will also be applied to your program while at Bishop Stang.  The Pathways Approach Program serves students with learning differences, offering small group and one-on-one support to students, classroom accommodations, and access to an Orton-Gillingham trained teacher for reading support.

Athletics and activities
Bishop Stang offers over 47 varsity, junior varsity, and freshman interscholastic sports teams including 27 varsity athletic teams and 19 sub-varsity teams.   The school offers more than 25 co-curricular activities. Bishop Stang's athletic teams have historically been successful in both men's and women's sports.

Basketball
In 2016, the boys' basketball team won their first MIAA Division 3 title in program history. Led by coach Colbey Santos, who himself had been to the semifinal game at the Boston Garden, the team defeated Dedham, Norwell, Cardinal Spellman, and Apponequet to win the South Sectional title. After beating Bedford at the Garden 63-43, the Spartans clinched the state title by defeating Oxford 80-64.

Football
In 1993 the Bishop Stang Spartans finished undefeated within the Eastern Athletic Conference and earned the conference’s title. This led to the Spartan’s first ever Superbowl appearance. In 1993’s Division 2B Superbowl, Bishop Stang lost to Wellesley 31-7. In 2005, the Spartan’s football team won the Eastern Athletic Conference title again. The 2005 team earned a berth in the state playoffs in the process as well. The Spartans upset powerhouse Wareham in the semi-finals, and advanced to the Division 2A State Championship game, but were defeated 28-13 by perennial power Duxbury. the Spartans finished the 2005 season with a 10-3 overall record. In 2006, the football team completed an undefeated regular season with a 9-0 record and won the Eastern Athletic Conference for the second consecutive year. They also clinched their second straight state playoff berth in the process. However, the Spartans were defeated by eventual state champions, Foxboro in the semi-finals.

Hockey
In 2005, the Spartan hockey team won the Southeastern Massachusetts Championship, to advance to the State Championship. They were handed defeat, 6-3, by Western/Central Mass Champion Marlboro.

Swimming & Diving
In 2008, 2010, and 2012 the men's swimming and diving team won the Southern Massachusetts Conference Championship.

Lacrosse
Boys' lacrosse won the Eastern Athletic Conference title in 2014 by defeating rival Bishop Feehan.

Field Hockey
The field hockey has been noted for its many achievements, winning 11 conference championships (1974, 1976, 1978, 1980, 1988, 1990, 1995, 2008, 2010, 2011, and 2015), 4 sectional championships ( 1975, 1977, 1981, 1983), and the 1983 state championship. They were also sectional finalists in 1982, 1985, 1986, 1990, and 2008, as well as state finalists in 1975 and 1977.

Golf
The golf team has won the Massachusetts State Championship 3 times: 2002-2003, and 2021. The 2021 team went 14-1 in regular season match play, and finished in 9th place at the High School National Championship in July of 2022. In the 2022 season, the team came 2nd in the state, being edged out by Old Rochester Regional.

References

External links
 Official website
 Entry at PrivateSchoolReview.com

1959 establishments in Massachusetts
Catholic secondary schools in Massachusetts
Dartmouth, Massachusetts
Educational institutions established in 1959
Schools in Bristol County, Massachusetts